Akright City is a residential community in Wakiso District of the Central Region of Uganda.

Location
Akright City is bordered by Namugongo Road to the north, the community of Bwebajja and Kampala–Entebbe Road to the east, Namulanda to the southeast, Palm Valley Golf and Country Club to the south, and the community of Sekiwunga and Entebbe–Kampala Expressway to the west. The coordinates of the neighborhood are:0°10'21.0"N, 32°31'06.0"E (Latitude:0.172504; Longitude:32.518333).

Overview
In 2002, Anatoli Kamugisha, the proprietor of Akright Projects Limited, acquired , formerly belonging to the family of the late Badru Kakunglu. Akright then designed a self-sustaining community of twelve smaller neighborhoods, grouped based on the price of the housing in each neighborhood. The development includes schools, shopping malls, a hospital, supermarkets, a golf club and a golf course. The estate is continually being expanded, with final development planned or 2022.

See also
List of roads in Uganda
Nakawa–Naguru Estates

Diagrams
Partial rendering of Akright City

References

External links
Uganda’s real estate sector set to thrive in 2015
Mainstreaming Environmental issues in Housing Development: Drawing lessons from Akright Kakungulu Housing Estates
Ways you can buy a house from agents

Populated places in Central Region, Uganda
Wakiso District
Private housing estates in Uganda